John H. Erickson is an Eastern Orthodox American scholar, with specialization in the areas of Orthodox canon law and church history. From 2002 until 2007, he served as the Dean of Saint Vladimir's Orthodox Theological Seminary in the United States. John Behr.

After growing up in northern Minnesota, Erickson joined the Eastern Orthodox Church in 1964.  He studied at Harvard (BA, 1966), Yale (MPhil, 1970), and St Vladimir's Seminary (ThM, 1984).

Erickson began teaching canon law and church history at Saint Vladimir's Seminary in 1973. Over the years, he has been a member of the OCA's Canonical Commission, Department of External Church Relations, Statute Commission, and Department of History and Archives.

On , he was elected Dean of Saint Vladimir Orthodox Theological Seminary by the school's trustees. He became Dean in July 2002 following the retirement of  Thomas Hopko. Erickson became the first layman, first convert, and first person of non-Russian background to hold the position of Dean since the seminary began.

Both ordinations were performed by the Seminary president, Metropolitan Herman (Swaiko) of the Orthodox Church in America.

On , Metropolitan Herman announced that, in accordance with the decision of the Seminary's Board of Trustees, Fr. Erickson would step down as the Dean of the Seminary after the completion of his current term. He continued teaching at the seminary as Peter N. Gramowich Professor of Church History until his retirement after the 2008–2009 academic year.

In , Erickson presented "The Eastern Catholic Churches: An Orthodox Perspective" at the conference "The Vatican II Decree on the Eastern Catholic Churches,  - Fifty Years Later" organized by the Metropolitan Andrey Sheptytsky Institute of Eastern Christian Studies held at the University of Toronto.

Selected works
 
 
 
 
 
 
 Co-editor, five volumes of Orthodox liturgical music (St. Vladimir's Seminary Press).

References

External links
 

20th-century Eastern Orthodox Christians
21st-century American clergy
21st-century Eastern Orthodox priests
American Eastern Orthodox priests
Eastern Orthodox priests in the United States
Harvard University alumni
Living people
Members of the Orthodox Church in America
Yale University alumni
Year of birth missing (living people)